The Lough Mask Murders were the murders on 3 January 1882 of Joseph Huddy and his grandson, John Huddy, in the townland of Upper Cloghbrack, County Galway, on the southern shore of Lough Mask in the west of Ireland. Joseph Huddy was the bailiff for Arthur Guinness, Lord Ardilaun, a major landlord in a region where agrarian disturbances of the Land War were prominent. The victims' bodies were weighed down and concealed in the lough itself. The controversial lack of credible witnesses led to four well-publicised trials of the accused in December 1882.

Disappearance
Joseph Huddy, who lived in Creevagh near Cong, had been bailiff for the Guinnesses for over 30 years. On the morning of the murders, Joseph Huddy left home with his 17-year-old nephew to go to Clonbur and Cornamona to serve eviction notices  on twelve of Lord Ardilaun's tenant farmers who had been withholding rent.  The area was close to land managed by Charles Boycott, eponymous target of the most famous boycott of the Land War. The Huddys began service in the village of Middle Cloghbrack (also known as America) before proceeding to Upper Cloghbrack, a densely populated area with no defined village centre, on the southern shore of Lough Mask.

At 10:00 a.m., the Huddys left Michael Coyne, their driver, where the road intersected with the main road running south to Cornamona. After telling Coyne to meet them in about an hour, by which time they would have served all 12 ejectments, the last one being served on Mathias Kerrigan, they set out on foot. When they had not returned by 4:00 p.m., the driver drove on to Cornamona where he alerted the Royal Irish Constabulary (RIC). The police proceeded to Upper Cloghbrack to look for the missing Huddys.

Investigation
The next day, the police questioned all of the adults of Upper Cloghbrack, but no one had any information on the Huddys even though it was known that Huddy and his grandson had gone into Upper Cloghbrack for the purpose of serving ejectment papers the previous day. After tracing the Huddys' movements as far as the house of Mathias Kerrigan, the police found evidence of a struggle in Kerrigan's yard, as well as a mark made by a bullet in the wall of the gable end of Kerrigan's house and bloodstains on the wall. Kerrigan and his sixteen-year-old son Matthew were taken into custody.

For four days, the RIC dug up bogland and searched the mountains without result. Forty crewmen of HMS Banterer, a Royal Navy vessel anchored in Galway Bay, sailed up the River Corrib to Lough Mask. After dragging the lake for 12 days they recovered the decomposing bodies, first John's in a sack and then Joseph's weighted with a rock in his overcoat.

The RIC, now believing that the death of the Huddys was a result of an entire village rising up against the process servers, arrested, in addition to Mathias Kerrigan and his son, fifteen men on suspicion of complicity in the murders. Mathias Kerrigan was detained in Galway City Jail for nine months without being charged. In September 1882, he turned approver, that is, an informer, and named three men as responsible for the killings. Michael Flynn and Thomas Higgins of Middle Cloghbrack and Patrick Higgins (Long) of Upper Cloghbrack were charged with the murders.

Legal process and executions
In four separate trials, one ending in a hung jury, all three men were found guilty and sentenced to death by Judge William O'Brien. Flynn asserted his innocence and showed remarkable courage on hearing the sentence. The defendants came from an Irish-speaking area of Ireland and trials were characterised by argumentative exchanges between the witnesses and the defendants in Irish, with RIC Constables providing the translations, thus undermining the reliability of the verdicts. The trials took place in Dublin before mainly Protestant juries, but the presiding Judge was a devout Catholic, albeit with a rather questionable reputation. Probably the fullest sketch of O'Brien's character is by Maurice Healy in his memoir The Old Munster Circuit (1939). Since Healy was extremely proud of the overall quality of the Irish judiciary in his youth, it is interesting that he made an exception for O'Brien, whom he called "a man who worked more injustice in his daily round than the reader would believe possible".

Patrick Higgins, Thomas Higgins, and Michael Flynn were hanged in Galway City Jail in January 1883.

Descendants of Patrick and Thomas Higgins and Michael Flynn vigorously maintain the innocence of these men.

Popular media
The historical novel,"Part an Irishman"  by TS Flynn is dedicated to Michael Flynn's memory.

References

Footnotes

Sources

Citations

1882 murders in the United Kingdom
History of County Galway
1882 in Ireland
Murder in Ireland
1880s murders in Ireland